Alessio Cossu (born 14 January 1986) is an Italian footballer who plays as a midfielder or forward. He played in Serie C1 for Ravenna and Manfredonia.

Career
Born in Cagliari, Sardinia, Cossu was sold to Serie C1 side Ravenna in co-ownership deal. In June 2007, Cagliari decided to give their remain registration rights to Ravenna after Cossu just played twice for his new club.

He was then sold to Serie C1 side Manfredonia in another co-ownership deal as Ravenna promoted to Serie B. He joined Monopoli in mid-season.

In June 2008, Manfredonia got the remain registration rights.

In August 2008, he swapped club with Francesco Indirli. and in January 2009 returned to Sardinia for Alghero., rejoined former team-mate Roberto Puddu.

In the 2009–10 season, his former Cagliari youth team team-mate Andrea Cocco, Andrea Peana, Simone Aresti, Nicola Lai  and Enrico Cotza (in January) joined him at Alghero.

Honours

Club
Ravenna
Serie C1/B: 2006–07

References

External links
 
 Profile at AIC.Football.it 

Italian footballers
Cagliari Calcio players
Ravenna F.C. players
Manfredonia Calcio players
A.S.D. Victor San Marino players
Association football midfielders
Sportspeople from Cagliari
1986 births
Living people
Footballers from Sardinia
Pol. Alghero players